Stinson Municipal Airport  is seven miles south of downtown San Antonio in Bexar County, Texas. The National Plan of Integrated Airport Systems for 2011–2015 categorized it as a reliever airport.

History
Stinson Municipal Airport is the second oldest general aviation airport in continuous operation in the United States (after College Park Airport).

Established in October 1915, when the Stinson family initially leased the land from the City of San Antonio.  The Stinsons had been operating out of Fort Sam Houston but had to relocate when the 1st Aero Squadron took over the fort's air facilities to monitor the border.  Emma Stinson leased 750 acres southeast of town, and Edward Stinson cleared the mesquite.  The Stinson School of Flying was managed by Emma Stinson, and financed by Katherine Stinson. Eddie worked as one of the mechanics, while Marjorie Stinson was the flight instructor.  The first class of five Canadians graduated in November 1915.  By March 1916, the school had 24 students and four aircraft.

Civilian flights were banned during WWI, and the airport became San Antonio's civil airport in 1918.  The name was changed to Windburn Field in 1927, but then changed back to Stinson Field in 1936. The Works Progress Administration built the terminal building between 1935 and 1936.  During World War II the airfield was used by the United States Army Air Forces as a training base. At the end of the war the airfield was returned over to the City of San Antonio for civil use.

As the reliever for San Antonio International, the airport has an FBO, three flight schools, police and state aviation units, a part 135 operator, two aerial photography outfits, helicopter tour company and helicopter flight school, and numerous general aviation aircraft. It is also home to the Texas Air Museum. The historic terminal was renovated in 2006-2008 and runway 9-27 re-opened on March 11, 2010 after being re-surfaced and extended to 5002 feet, allowing more private and business jet traffic.

In August 2010 The Texas Wing of the Civil Air Patrol announced it will be moving its statewide headquarters to Stinson Municipal Airport. It was only in Stinson for several years before moving to its current location.

In March 2017, funded by the City of San Antonio and Texas Department of Transportation, construction of a new control tower for the airport began as an attempt to make the airport more attractive to corporate travelers and to bring attention to the historic sites surrounding the airport. Construction of the new tower was completed and began its operation in 2019.

Facilities
The airport covers 360 acres (146 ha) at an elevation of 577 feet (176 m). It has two asphalt runways: 9/27 is 5,000 by 100 feet (1,524 x 30 m) and 14/32 is 4,128 by 100 feet (1,258 x 30 m).

In the year ending March 26, 2011 the airport had 157,044 aircraft operations, average 430 per day: 95% general aviation and 5% military. 42 aircraft were then based at the airport: 76% single-engine, 12% multi-engine, and 12% helicopter.

See also 
 Texas World War II Army Airfields
 List of airports in Texas
 Tex Hill

References

Further reading 
 Thole, Lou (1999), Forgotten Fields of America : World War II Bases and Training, Then and Now - Vol. 2.  Publisher: Pictorial Histories Pub,

External links 

* 

Airports in Texas
Buildings and structures in San Antonio
Transportation in San Antonio
Transportation in Bexar County, Texas
Airfields of the United States Army Air Forces in Texas